Mr. Bungle is an American experimental rock band formed in Eureka, California in 1985. Having gone through many incarnations throughout their career, the band is best known for music created during their most experimental era. During this time, they developed a highly eclectic style, cycling through several musical genres, often within the course of a single song, including heavy metal, avant-garde jazz, ska, disco, and funk, which is further enhanced by lead vocalist Mike Patton's versatile singing style. This period also saw the band utilizing unconventional song structures and samples; playing a wide array of instruments; dressing up in masks, jumpsuits, and other costumes; and performing a diverse selection of cover songs during live performances.

The band was founded in Eureka, California in 1985 as a death metal project while the members were still in high school. They named themselves after a character in the 1960 children's educational film Beginning Responsibility: Lunchroom Manners, later featured in the 1981 HBO special The Pee-wee Herman Show. Mr. Bungle released four demo tapes in the mid-to-late 1980s. They signed to Warner Bros. Records in 1990 on the back of Patton's success as frontman of Faith No More, and released three full-length studio albums between 1991 and 1999, which featured the eclectic, experimental style they became known for. The band toured in 1999 and 2000 to support their third album before going on hiatus; ultimately revealing that they had dissolved. They reunited as a thrash metal band for a series of shows in February 2020 to perform their 1986 demo album The Raging Wrath of the Easter Bunny with Anthrax guitarist Scott Ian and Slayer drummer Dave Lombardo. They subsequently returned to the studio to re-record the demo as a professional album and released it on October 30, 2020.

Although Mr. Bungle went through several line-up changes, the longest-serving members were Patton, guitarist Trey Spruance, bassist Trevor Dunn, saxophonists Clinton "Bär" McKinnon and Theo Lengyel, and drummer Danny Heifetz, with Patton, Spruance, and Dunn performing in every version of the band. Members were based in San Francisco during the band's tenure with Warner Bros. During much of the band's existence, they were involved in a public dispute with Red Hot Chili Peppers, particularly between Patton and Chili Peppers vocalist Anthony Kiedis, which was played upon by the press, including TV and media personalities. In later years, members of the bands have shown respect to each other.

History

Formation (1985–1989)

Mr. Bungle emerged after its members were kicked out of their respective previous bands. "It was kinda like a merger between two bands," Mike Patton recalled. "One really horrible gothic metal band, which our guitarist and original drummer were in, and one really horrible metal band which did Metallica covers, which is the one Trevor and me came from." Mr. Bungle initially described themselves as a death metal band, but also dabbled in speed metal, thrash metal, and hardcore punk. The members came very close to naming the band Summer Breeze before settling on the name Mr. Bungle. The Mr. Bungle name was inspired by a 1950s propaganda film that they had seen as a segment of The Pee-wee Herman Show. The members previously used the name to refer to a fellow classmate that they thought to be "a total goober" before adopting it as the band name.

Within a year of formation, the band expanded their sound to include ska. Trevor Dunn noted that,  "After about a year we got tired of playing speed metal and wanted to do something a little more creative. So we just stopped and started writing our own style of music, which was influenced by bands like Camper Van Beethoven, Oingo Boingo, Bad Manners and kind of funky, ska-oriented stuff. Then we added a two-piece horn section and a new drummer, so now we don't really have any kind of limit on the music we play." Trey Spruance corroborated this. "When I was 15, I was in a death metal group," Spruance reminisced. "We had this idea that we were going to play a bunch of ska tunes for a bunch of metalheads. We just had this idea, you know: ‘Okay, we’re going to play this ska music, and that’ll be amazing.’ Half of the audience hated us, but there was definitely a joy in confronting that wall between styles.”

Given that the band's background was exclusively in heavy music at that point, some band members experienced difficulties expanding their sound early on. In particular, Spruance noted that Mike Patton had to teach him to play the ska stroke for a performance at their high school talent show. Spruance later explained, "Oh, what I remember was... this was our first... like, we had only done, uh, death metal up to that point. And so this was our first time trying to ever play ska. And I'd never played... on guitar, like, I'd never played... I didn't know how to do that skanking guitar shit at all. But Patton could do, like with one finger on the thread mark, he could do the, the rhythmic part of it pretty well. Like, he could... he taught me how to do it. So, I just sort of awkwardly... I would fill in and make the chord and he actually played guitar, but would just kind of use it percussively. And we played these Camper Van Beethoven songs, and I don't... I dunno if we played The Specials, but that's what we were listening to."

Mr. Bungle played their first show during November 1985 at the Bayside Grange Hall. The band's first demo, The Raging Wrath of the Easter Bunny, was recorded during Easter of 1986. It featured a fast, lo-fi death/thrash sound, with touches of ska. Instruments utilized on the album included a train whistle, saxophone, bongos and a kazoo. The Raging Wrath of the Easter Bunny was followed in 1987 by the Bowel of Chiley demo; it featured a much greater ska presence, as well as the sounds of jazz, swing and funk. Bradley Torreano noted at AllMusic that the recording was "essentially the sound of some very talented teenagers trying to make their love of jazz and ska come together in whatever way they can." In 1988, Mr. Bungle released their third demo, Goddammit I Love America!, which was musically similar to Bowel of Chiley. Mike Patton described its style as "funkadelic, thrashing, circus, ska." In 1988, Mike Patton became the lead vocalist for San Francisco's Faith No More, getting the job after the band heard him on the first two Mr. Bungle demos. Patton continued to be a member of both bands simultaneously and Mr. Bungle released OU818, their final demo tape, in 1989. OU818, was the first release to feature both tenor sax player Clinton "Bär" McKinnon and drummer Danny Heifetz and contained re-recorded songs from the earlier demos, as well as several new tracks. At the time of this release, Mike Patton described Mr. Bungle as a "weirdo funk band".

Mr. Bungle (1990–1993)

During 1990, the band members left Eureka for San Francisco, in search of greater musical opportunities. Trey Spruance said the change in location influenced the band's style, remarking "[we were interested in] Slayer and Mercyful Fate. Later it was The Specials and Fishbone. Then we moved to San Francisco and got all sophisticated. Now we are improv snobs who rule the avant-garde universe by night, and poor, fucked-up hipsters by day." Having established a following in Northern California, Mr. Bungle was signed to Warner Bros. Records in 1990, with the label releasing all three of their studio albums during the 1990s. It has been speculated that Patton's success as frontman of Faith No More was the primary reason Warner Bros. signed the band. The Los Angeles Times stated in a 1991 article that "Under normal circumstances, you'd have to describe Mr. Bungle's chances of landing a major label deal as... a long shot."

Their debut album, Mr. Bungle, was produced by jazz experimentalist John Zorn and was released on August 13, 1991. The cover featured artwork by Dan Sweetman, originally published in the story, "A Cotton Candy Autopsy" in the DC Comics/Piranha Press imprint title, Beautiful Stories for Ugly Children. The record mixed metal, funk, ska, carnival music and free jazz, but was normally described as funk metal by music critics. It received mostly positive reviews, with journalist Bill Pahnelas calling it "an incredible musical tour de force". On the style of the album, critic Steve Huey wrote in AllMusic: "Mr. Bungle is a dizzying, disconcerting, schizophrenic tour through just about any rock style the group can think of, hopping from genre to genre without any apparent rhyme or reason, and sometimes doing so several times in the same song."

The first track was originally titled "Travolta". At Warner Brothers' encouragement, it was renamed Quote Unquote in later pressings, due to fears regarding a potential lawsuit. The band created a music video for the song, directed by Kevin Kerslake. However, MTV refused to air the video because of images of bodies dangling on meat hooks. The album sold well despite MTV refusing to air their video and a lack of radio airplay. Almost all the members went by obscure aliases in the album credits. To promote the album in some stores, a Mr. Bungle bubble bath was given away with copies of the record sold. Following the release of the album the band toured North America.

Disco Volante (1994–1997)

Due to artwork delays and the band members' many side-projects, it was four years before Disco Volante was released, in October 1995. The new album displayed musical development and a shift in tone from their earlier recordings. While the self-titled album was described as "funk metal", with Disco Volante this label was replaced with "avant-garde" or "experimental".

The music was complex and unpredictable, with the band continuing with their shifts of musical style. Some of the tracks were in foreign languages and would radically change genres mid-song. Featuring lyrics about death, suicide and child abuse, along with children's songs and a Middle Eastern techno number, music critic Greg Prato described the album as having "a totally original and new musical style that sounds like nothing that currently exists". Not all critics were impressed with the album, with The Washington Post describing it as "an album of cheesy synthesizers, mangled disco beats, virtuosic playing and juvenile noises", calling it "self-indulgent" and adding that "Mr. Bungle's musicians like to show off their classical, jazz and world-beat influences in fast, difficult passages which are technically impressive but never seem to go anywhere". Additionally, writer Scott McGaughey described it as "difficult", and was critical of its "lack of actual songs". Disco Volante included influences from contemporary classical music, avant-garde jazz, electronic music pioneer Pierre Henry, Edgar Allan Poe, John Zorn, Krzysztof Penderecki and European film music of the 1960s and 1970s, such as those composed by Ennio Morricone and Peter Thomas. The album notes also contained an invitation to participate in an "unusual scam" – if $2 was sent to the band's address, participants would receive additional artwork, lyrics to the songs "Ma Meeshka Mow Skwoz" and "Chemical Marriage" and some stickers. The vinyl release of this album shipped with a 7" by the then-unknown Secret Chiefs 3. In 1996, Theo Lengyel retired as Bungle's original sax player and keyboardist due to creative differences.

Mr. Bungle supported this record with their first world tour, performing across North America, Europe and Australia during 1995 and 1996. In early 1997, the band began work on a covers album, however it was put on indefinite hold due to Patton's touring commitments with Faith No More. Later in 1997, the Seattle-based Rastacore Records started distributing CDs of Bowel of Chiley (incorrectly labelled Bowl of Chiley on the Rastacore release). This was done without official authorization from Mr. Bungle or Warner Bros., and as such production was halted, with only a limited number of CDs surviving.

California (1998–2000)

After a two-year break which saw Faith No More split, Mr. Bungle reconvened in 1998 to record new material. The band's third album, California, was released on July 13, 1999. Ground and Sky reviews have described California as Mr. Bungle's most accessible and, while the genre shifts are still present, they are less frequent, with succinct song formats resulting in an album that The Associated Press called "surprisingly linear". AllMusic described the record as "their most concise album to date; and while the song structures are far from traditional, they're edging more in that direction, and that greatly helps the listener in making sense of the often random-sounding juxtapositions of musical genres". On the different style of this album, Mike Patton explained that to the band "the record is pop-y", before adding "but to some fucking No Doubt fan in Ohio, they're not going to swallow that." The album was generally well received, with music critic Robert Everett-Green stating, "The band's newest and greatest album does not reveal itself quickly, but once the bug bites, there is no cure. The best disc of the year, by a length."

The recording process for California was more complex than for the band's previous records. They chose to record the disc to analog tape rather than digitally and some songs required several 24-track machines, utilizing over 50 tracks. As a result, each song contains layers of original samples, keyboards, percussion and melodies. The album displays influences from Burt Bacharach and The Beach Boys, while blending lounge, pop, doo-wop, jazz, funk, exotica, thrash metal, Hawaiian, Middle Eastern, alternative metal, surf music, kecak and avant-garde music. The band toured North America, Australia and Europe to support the record. They also notably appeared on the 2000 edition of the SnoCore Tour, performing alongside alternative metal acts whom they had influenced, such as Incubus and System of a Down. According to Trevor Dunn, Mr. Bungle were "completely out of place" on the SnoCore Tour. He stated, "We were sort of the grandpas of the tour, so we started really messing with the audiences. We dressed up like the Village People and acted super gay which really pissed off the metal kids."

The band played what would turn out to be their last concert in nearly 20 years on September 9, 2000 in Nottingham, England. Following the California tour, the members again went their separate ways to pursue their various side projects. During the early 2000s, Patton was primarily touring and recording with his metal project Fantômas and the newly formed supergroup Tomahawk. Mr. Bungle were assumed to be in another period of self-described "hibernation", with Patton optimistically stating in October 2001 to Kerrang! that "it's gotta take a rest. There's a few of us that aren't even ready to face it again for a while. We'll put it on the shelf for now and see what happens to it and hopefully revisit it again."

Post-breakup events (2000–2019)
After the dissolution of Mr. Bungle, the members went on to numerous different projects. Mike Patton co-founded the record label Ipecac Recordings and is involved with several other ventures, including various works with composer John Zorn, and most notably the bands Fantômas, Tomahawk, and Peeping Tom. In 2004, he was called upon by Icelandic singer-songwriter Björk to provide vocal work on her album Medúlla. He acted in the motion picture Firecracker, narrated the film Bunraku, and did voice work in the movie I Am Legend, performing the screams and howls of the infected humans. He also did zombie and other character voices in the game Left 4 Dead (as well as the growls for the anger core in the game Portal). Additionally, in 2009 and 2010 Patton embarked on a world tour with Faith No More after they reunited. Trey Spruance is involved with various bands, including Secret Chiefs 3 and Faxed Head. Trevor Dunn joined Patton in Fantômas and Tomahawk as well as forming his own jazz band, Trevor Dunn's Trio Convulsant; he also occasionally played bass with Secret Chiefs 3. Danny Heifetz's projects included playing with Secret Chiefs 3 and in a country/punk band called Dieselhed; he now resides in Sydney, and plays in outfits such as The Exiles, The Tango Saloon and The Fantastic Terrific Munkle. Clinton McKinnon also played with Secret Chiefs 3. In 2002, he moved to Melbourne, Australia, after getting into a relationship with an Australian woman he met at a 2000 Mr. Bungle concert in Sydney. Following his move to Melbourne, he went on to play with The Ribbon Device and Umläut.

Spruance joined Patton and Faith No More onstage for the first time to perform the King for a Day... Fool for a Lifetime album in its entirety in Santiago in November 2011. Mike Patton sang on the Secret Chiefs 3 song "La Chanson de Jacky" in 2012 giving further speculation by fans on the chance of a reunion. Despite this, Trevor Dunn stated in a February 2013 interview with SF Weekly that there will be no Mr. Bungle reunion, saying, "I've heard the faintest murmurings about it, but honestly I don't think anyone is interested. It's nothing personal, either. We all feel like that band said what it needed to say. It would feel weird and awkward to play that music again. It would take a pant-load of money to make it happen, and honestly, I don't want to do it for that reason. I would prefer to let go of it, respectfully." When asked about Mr. Bungle reuniting in an interview published in February 2014, Patton responded by saying, "Who knows? It certainly doesn't seem like it's on the tip of anyone's lips, but I could have said the same thing – and in fact, I did say the same thing – about Faith No More, and that happened. And I think it happened for the better." Around this time, a book entitled The Faith No More & Mr. Bungle Companion was released, which covered both bands' histories.

Reunion and The Raging Wrath of the Easter Bunny Demo (2019–present)
On August 13, 2019, it was announced that Mr. Bungle would reunite in February 2020 for three shows in Los Angeles, San Francisco and Brooklyn. The reunion was promoted as featuring Patton, Spruance and Dunn, as well as guitarist Scott Ian and drummer Dave Lombardo, performing the 1986 demo album The Raging Wrath of the Easter Bunny in its entirety. On August 15, after a strong demand for tickets for all three shows, the band added an additional show to each city. A third L.A. show was added on August 21, bringing the total number of reunion shows to seven. The band stated on their Facebook page that they were not going to perform any songs from their Warner Bros. albums.

During the reunion shows, Mr. Bungle covered songs of various metal and hardcore punk bands such as Slayer, Corrosion of Conformity, Circle Jerks, Crumbsuckers and Cro-Mags in addition to performing three previously unreleased songs which were written during the era of The Raging Wrath of the Easter Bunny demo: "Glutton For Punishment", "Methamatics", and "Eracist". Although the entire recording was promoted as being performed, non-metal songs from the demo (such as "Grizzly Adams" and "Evil Satan") were absent from the performances. The only exception was "Hypocrites", albeit with the ska sections eliminated.

The choice of songs received a mixed reaction from certain portions of the band's fanbase. In their review of the Los Angeles gig, Revolver wrote "One of the most quietly influential bands in metal reunited last night in Los Angeles ... to play zero of the songs that made them influential."

Mr. Bungle collaborated with several guests during the shows including the comedian Eric Andre, who introduced the band at the beginning of their show at February 7, and Jed Watts, the original drummer of Mr. Bungle.

In the weeks following the February 2020 shows, Mr. Bungle posted without comment on their Twitter account pictures taken in a recording studio, hinting at an upcoming record. On March 23 and 24, Revolver magazine published a two-part press release and interview with Spruance formally announcing that the band, joined by Scott Ian and Dave Lombardo, were currently re-recording The Raging Wrath of the Easter Bunny in addition to the previously unreleased songs and covers performed during the reunion shows, with an expected release on Patton's label Ipecac Recordings in the fall of 2020. On June 5, Mr. Bungle released a cover of "U.S.A." by The Exploited, featuring a hardcore punk sound. "Doesn't matter what part of the political spectrum you are on, everyone at some point has said, 'Fuck the USA,'" Spruance commented. "The closest thing we have to a universal sentiment."

On August 13, the band officially announced the album's release date, now titled The Raging Wrath of the Easter Bunny Demo, released on October 30. Alongside the announcement, they released an animated music video for the single "Raping Your Mind" directed by Eric Livingston. Dunn described re-recording their earliest material with Lombardo and Ian like "we were finally utilizing our Ph.Ds in Thrash Metal. All we had to do was go back to our original professors for some additional guidance and talk them into joining us. Turns out we were A+ students... We were haunted for 35 years by the fact that this music wasn't given it's [sic] due respect. Now we can die."

Style and influence
Prior to the release of their first album in 1991, the Los Angeles Times stated that the band "performs oddball music one critic has described as Bugs Bunny-type jazz." Variety referred to the band as "Zappa-esque Bay Area pranksters" in 2000. Allmusic's Greg Prato described Mr. Bungle's music as a "unique mix of the experimental, the abstract, and the absurd", while Patrick Macdonald of The Seattle Times characterized their music as "harsh, grating, unstructured, blasting, squeaky, speedy, slow, eerie and strangely compelling". Distinctive features of the music were the use of numerous different instruments, unusual vocals, and the use of unpredictable song formats along with a number of different musical genres. Greg Prato stated they "may be the most talented rock instrumentalists today, as they skip musical genres effortlessly, while Mike Patton illustrates why many consider him to be the best singer in rock". Not all have agreed, with one reviewer calling the band the "most ridiculously terrible piece of festering offal ever scraped off the floor of a slaughterhouse". Journalist Geoffrey Himes criticized the band by stating "the vocals are so deeply buried in the music that the words are virtually indecipherable" and described the music as "aural montages rather than songs, for short sections erupt and suddenly disappear, replaced by another passage with little connection to what preceded it".

Mr. Bungle frequently incorporated unconventional instruments into their music including tenor sax, jaw harp, cimbalom, xylophone, glockenspiel, clarinet, ocarina, piano, organ, bongos, and woodblocks. Journalist John Serba commented that the instrumentation "sounded kind of like drunken jazz punctuated with Italian accordions and the occasional Bavarian march, giant power chord, or feedback noise thrown in". Overlaying this was Mike Patton's vocals, who often used death metal growls, crooning, rapping, screeching, gurgling, or whispering. The arrangement of their songs was also idiosyncratic, often lacking a structured song format and rotating through different genres ranging from slow melodies to thrash metal. New York Times journalist Jon Pareles described it as music that "leaps from tempo to tempo, key to key, style to style, all without warning". Similarly critic Patrick Macdonald commented, "In the middle of hard-to-follow, indecipherable noise, a relatively normal, funky jazz organ solo will suddenly drift in". Some of the genres they utilized include funk, ska punk, free jazz, ska, surf rock, punk, heavy metal, klezmer, kecak, avant-jazz, folk, noise rock, alternative metal/funk metal, pop, doo-wop, electronica, swing, space age pop and exotica, death metal, rockabilly, bossa nova, progressive rock, country and western, circus music, video game music, and cartoon music. However, their overall sound is often described as experimental rock, experimental music, alternative metal, avant-garde metal, funk metal, and thrash metal. Mike Patton has referred to their earlier, pre-debut album sound as being largely death metal.

The majority of the band's music and lyrics were written by Patton, Dunn, and Spruance, with McKinnon and Heifetz occasionally contributing. Regarding their creative process, McKinnon stated in a 2000 interview that "This band is kind of like a cruel boys club in a way. You bring some ideas and if you're not 100 percent firm about bringing a certain idea to this group, you can watch it get kicked aside and die really quickly."

It has been noted that the band were given an unusual amount of artistic freedom during their tenure with the major label Warner Bros. Records. In a 2016 interview, Trevor Dunn reflected —

Trey Spruance claimed that Warner Bros. cared so little about the band that they at one point were considering delivering an entire album of blank static noise, knowing that the label wouldn't listen to it in the first place. He said, "We could’ve delivered them static, literally. We thought about it. We almost did it, we were thinking about doing that. Then we realized – actually it doesn't matter to them; that would seem like a big statement but they would just shrug. They don't care about that shit."

Legacy
Mr. Bungle's style has influenced many acts from the alternative metal genre, most notably Korn, who have utilized what they have dubbed the "Mr. Bungle chord" (A flat fifth chord or "Tritone"). James "Munky" Shaffer, one of Korn's guitarists, stated in a 2015 interview that Mr. Bungle's self-titled debut "set the tone for us and what we went on to do creatively".

Stage shows and image

Mr. Bungle were known for their characteristically unconventional stage shows, where the band members would dress up in costumes and masks. The 1999–2000 shows in support of the California album usually featured Dunn dressed as a blonde girl resembling Goldilocks or The St. Pauli Girl, although for the other members this period was largely devoid of masks and outfits due to the increased demands of the music. Occasionally, the band would simply appear in black suits with white dress shirts or dress up in chef costumes, cowboy suits or as the Village People.

Members
All of the members of the 'classic' lineup of Mr. Bungle are multi-instrumentalists. The timeline below reflects only their main roles. Members of the band were known to switch instruments mid-performance.

Current
Mike Patton – lead vocals, keyboards, samples (1985–2000, 2019–present)
Trey Spruance – lead guitar, keyboards, piano, backing vocals (1985–2000, 2019–present)
Trevor Dunn – bass, backing vocals (1985–2000, 2019–present)
Scott Ian – rhythm guitar, backing vocals (2019–present)
Dave Lombardo – drums, glockenspiel (2019–present)

Former
Theo Lengyel – saxophone, keyboards (1985–1996)
Jed Watts – drums, backing vocals (1985–1987; guest performer, 2020)
Luke Miller – tenor sax, trumpet (1987–1989)
Scott Fritz – trumpet (1987)
Hans Wagner – drums (1987–1989)
Danny Heifetz – drums, tambourine, trumpet (1989–2000)
Clinton "Bär" McKinnon – tenor sax, clarinet, keyboards, piano, backing vocals (1989–2000)

Timeline

Discography

Studio albums

Live albums

Demos

Singles

Music videos

Live video

See also
List of alternative metal artists
List of avant-garde metal artists
List of bands from the San Francisco Bay Area
List of experimental musicians
List of funk metal and funk rock bands

References

External links
 Official website
 
 

American avant-garde metal musical groups
American experimental rock groups
American funk metal musical groups
Masked musicians
Surrealist groups
Musical groups established in 1985
Musical groups disestablished in 2000
Musical groups reestablished in 2019
Warner Records artists
1985 establishments in California